The 2012 World Outdoor Bowls Championship men's triples  was held at the Lockleys Bowling Club in Adelaide, Australia. Some of the qualifying Rounds were held at the nearby Holdfast Bowling Club in Glenelg North.

Graeme Archer, Darren Burnett and David Peacock won the men's triples Gold.

Section tables

Pool 1

Pool 2

Finals

Results

References

Men